Alex Callier (born 6 December 1972, in Sint-Niklaas, Belgium) is a member of Belgian rock band Hooverphonic.

Biography
Callier studied image, sound and editing at RITCS between 1990 and 1993. After his studies he worked as a sound engineer for the public Flemish broadcaster VRT. In 1995 he co-founded Hoover (later Hooverphonic), where he is active as a musician, as well as a composer and producer. In 1999 he wrote the music for the Belgian film Shades. In 2000 he received the ZAMU Award for Best Belgian producer.

In 2009, he launched his solo project Hairglow. In 2018, he co-wrote a Matter of Time, the song Sennek used to enter the Eurovision Song Contest.

ACTA treaty
Alex Callier was in favour of the now rejected ACTA treaty. He defended this proposal to restrict the internet, among other things, in the European Parliament.

References

1972 births
Living people
Belgian electronic musicians
Belgian rock musicians
People from Sint-Niklaas